Nontheist Quakers (also known as nontheist Friends or NtFs) are those who engage in Quaker practices and processes, but who do not necessarily believe in a theistic God or Supreme Being, the divine, the soul or the supernatural. Like traditional Quakers, also known as Friends, nontheist Friends are interested in realizing peace, simplicity, integrity, community, equality, love, joy, and social justice in the Society of Friends and beyond.

Beliefs 
Quakers in the unprogrammed or "silent worship" tradition of Quaker practice have in the 20th century begun to examine the significance of nontheistic beliefs in the Society of Friends, as part of the Quaker tradition of seeking truth. Non-theism among Quakers probably dates to the 1930s, when some Quakers in California branched off to form the Humanist Society of Friends (today part of the American Humanist Association), and when Henry Cadbury professed agnosticism in a 1936 lecture to Harvard Divinity School students. The term "non-theistic" first appeared in a Quaker publication in 1952 on conscientious objection. In 1976, a Friends General Conference Gathering hosted a well-attended Workshop for Nontheistic Friends (Quakers).

Current resources include a nontheist Friends' website and there are nontheist Quaker study groups. Os Cresson began a recent consideration of this issue from behaviorist, natural history, materialist and environmentalist perspectives. Roots and Flowers of Quaker Nontheism is one history. Nontheist Friends draw on Quaker humanist and universalist traditions. The book Godless for God's Sake: Nontheism in Contemporary Quakerism offers recent, critical contributions by Quakers. Some Friends engage the implications of human evolution, cognitive anthropology, evolutionary psychology, bodymind questions (esp. the "relaxation response"), primatology, evolutionary history, evolutionary biology, biology and consensus decision-making, online especially, in terms of Quaker nontheism.

Nontheist Friends tend to share the Religious Society of Friends (RSOF) historic Quaker peace testimony and support for war resistance and conscientious objection.

There are currently three main nontheist Quakers' web sites, including the Nontheist Friends' Official Website, Nontheist Friends Network Website (a listed informal group of Britain Yearly Meeting), and the Nontheist Friends' wiki subject/school at World University and School, which was founded by Scott MacLeod.

Nontheist Friends are a group of individuals, many of whom are affiliated or involved in the unprogrammed tradition in Quakerism. Nontheist Friends are attempting sympathetically to generate conversation with others who are more comfortable with the traditional and often reiterated language of Quakerism. Some nontheistic Friends see significance in this lower-case / upper-case distinction in terms of inclusiveness and friendliness, welcoming both to the ongoing NTF email list conversations. Questioning theism, they wish to examine whether the experience of direct and ongoing inspiration from God ("waiting in the Light") – "So wait upon God in that which is pure. ..." – which traditional Quakers understand as informing Silent Meeting and Meeting for Business, might be understood and embraced with different metaphors, language and discourse.

Books
Boulton, David (Ed). 2006. Godless for God's Sake – Nontheism in Contemporary Quakerism. Nontheist Friends. 
Cresson, Os, and David Boulton (Foreword). 2014. Quaker and Naturalist Too. Morning Walk Press.

Notable Nontheist Friends
 Piers Anthony
 Henry Cadbury
 Kersey Graves
 Sharman Apt Russell
 Nicholson Baker

See also
 American Friends Service Committee
 Christian atheism
 Friends Committee on National Legislation
 Nontheistic religion
 Sea of Faith

References

Further reading
 Boulton, David. The Trouble With God: Building the Republic of Heaven.
 Boulton, David. 2016. Through a glass darkly: A defence of Quaker nontheism. Cumbria, UK: Dales Historical Monographs.
 Case, Nat. 2013. I contradict myself: I am an atheist and a Quaker. Does it matter what I believe, when I recognise that religion is something I need?. London, England: Aeon Magazine. 
 Cresson, Os. 2007. Roots and Flowers of Quaker Nontheism. NontheistFriends.org. Jan 23. Accessed online: Dec 30, 2008.
 Crom, Scott. 1972. "The Trusting Agnostic." Quaker Religious Thought. Vol. 14(2): 1–39. Includes two carefully thought out replies and Crom's response.
 Dawkins, Richard. 2002. An Atheist's Call to Arms. Accessed online video: July 17, 2007. Monterey, CA: Ted Talks.
 Dennett, Daniel. 2006. A Secular, Scientific Rebuttal to Pastor Rick Warren. Accessed online video: July 17, 2007. Monterey, CA: Ted Talks.
 Durham, Geoffrey. (ed.). (in Press – Sep 2010). The Spirit of the Quakers. (Contains a nontheistic Friends' perspective by Alpern, Robin). New Haven, CT: Yale University Press. 
 Fager, Chuck. 2014. Remaking Friends: How Progressive Friends Changed Quakerism & Helped Save America. (A second volume provides the source documents he used in his study: Angels of Progress: The Documentary History of the Progressive Friends). CreateSpace Independent Publishing Platform. 
 Hecht, Jennifer Michael. 2003. Doubt: A History: The Great Doubters and Their Legacy of Innovation from Socrates and Jesus to Thomas Jefferson and Emily Dickinson. Harper Collins. 
 Jackson, Kenneth T. 2007. A Colony with a Conscience: This republic owes its enduring strength to a fragile, scorched and little-known document known as the Flushing Remonstrance. Dec. 27, 2007. Accessed online: December 27, 2007. New York: New York Times online.
 Miles, Jack. 1996. God: A Biography. Vintage. 
 Myers, PZ. 2013. The Happy Atheist. Random House. 
 Riemermann, James. 2006. What is a Nontheist? NontheistFriends.org. Sep 20. Accessed online: July 17, 2007.
 Rush, David 2002/3 They too are Quakers: A survey of 199 Nontheist Friends, The Woodbrooke Journal No. 11.
 Russell, Bertrand (E. Haldeman-Julius, ed.). 1927. On Why I Am Not a Christian: An Examination of the God-Idea and Christianity. Accessed online: July 17, 2007. Little Blue Book No. 1372.
 Muriel Seltman's books Bread and Roses and Rescuing God From Religion
 Spong, John Shelby. 1998. Why Christianity Must Change or Die: A Bishop Speaks to Believers In Exile. New York, NY: Harper One.

External links
 Official Website Of Nontheist Friends
 Nontheist Friends Network (a listed informal group of Britain Yearly Meeting)
 Nontheist Friends' wiki school at World University and School

 
Christian secularism
Freethought
Humanism
Nontheism
Quaker theology
Religious atheism